Emily Head (born 15 December 1988) is an English actress. Her breakout role was as Carli D'Amato in E4's sitcom The Inbetweeners and she later played Rebecca White in the ITV soap opera Emmerdale and Colette Andrews in BBC drama, The Syndicate.

Early life
Head is the elder daughter of actor Anthony Head. She attended the BRIT School in Croydon, where she completed a BTEC course in acting and was a schoolmate of singers Katy B and Adele.

Career
Head played a supporting role as Carli D'Amato in E4's sitcom, The Inbetweeners from 2008 until 2010 as well as appearing in its 2011 film The Inbetweeners Movie. She also appeared in an episode of M.I. High, in which she played an evil mastermind involved in a bank scam.

In 2011, she appeared alongside Coronation Street star Craig Gazey in Jason Hall's play Third Floor. In December 2011, she played Melissa Milcote in the Bristol Old Vic production of Helen Edmundson's Coram Boy at the Colston Hall in Bristol.

In 2013, it was announced she would be appearing in the Bravo drama Rita, playing the title character's daughter. In 2014, she played Angela "Ange" in an in-the-round production of Abigail's Party at Leicester's Curve.

Emmerdale
In September 2016, it was announced that Head would be joining the cast of the ITV soap opera Emmerdale, playing the role of Rebecca White. Rebecca is the daughter of Lawrence White (John Bowe), half-sister of Chrissie White (Louise Marwood) and aunt of Lachlan White (Thomas Atkinson). Head made her first appearance as Rebecca on 11 October 2016. Head's character left Emmerdale in an episode airing 2 November 2018.

Filmography

Awards and nominations

References

External links

 

1988 births
Living people
English television actresses
Actresses from London
People educated at the BRIT School
People from Fulham
English soap opera actresses
English child actresses
21st-century English actresses